Obsessions is the third album by gothic rock band Corpus Delicti. The album contains a cover of the song "Atmosphere" by Joy Division. It was remastered and re-released in 1997 with bonus tracks.

Track listing
"An Obsession" – 2:08
"Broken" – 4:30
"Atmosphere" (Joy Division Cover) – 3:24
"The Drift" – 4:47
"Treasures" – 4:22
"Motherland" – 6:11
"Dragon Song (Phantom Song)" – 3:46
"Dancing Ghost" – 3:14
"Appealing Skies" – 3:57
"Lies Spoken" – 11:34

Lyrics by Sebastien
Music by Corpus Delicti
Except Track 3, by Ian Curtis and Joy Division

Corpus Delicti (band) albums
1995 albums